Empathic concern refers to other-oriented emotions elicited by, and congruent with the perceived welfare of, someone in need. These other-oriented emotions include feelings of tenderness, sympathy, compassion, soft-heartedness, and the like. 

Empathic concern is often confused with empathy. To empathize is to respond to another's perceived emotional state by experiencing feeling of a similar sort. Empathic concern or sympathy includes not only empathizing, but also having a positive regard or a non-fleeting concern for the other person.

Definition
C. Daniel Batson, a pioneer of the term, defines it as "other-oriented emotion elicited by and congruent with the perceived welfare of someone in need". Batson explains this definition in the following way:

Others use different terms for this construct or very similar constructs. Especially popular—perhaps more popular than "empathic concern"—are sympathy, compassion, or pity. Other terms include the tender emotion and sympathetic distress.

People are strongly motivated to be connected to others. In humans and higher mammals, an impulse to care for offspring is almost certainly genetically hard-wired, although modifiable by circumstance.

Evolutionary origins
At the behavioral level it is evident from the descriptions by comparative psychologists and ethologists that behaviors homologous to empathic concern can be observed in other mammalian species. Notably, a variety of reports on ape empathic reactions suggest that, apart from emotional connectedness, apes have an explicit appreciation of the other's situation. A good example is consolation, defined as reassurance behavior by an uninvolved bystander towards one of the combatants in a previous aggressive incident.

Developmental origins
Empathic concern is thought to emerge later in development and to require more self-control than either emotional contagion or personal distress. Developmental research indicates a broad range of social competencies children bring to their interpersonal relationships. As early as two years of age, children show (a) the cognitive capacity to interpret, in simple ways, the physical and psychological states of others, (b) the emotional capacity to experience, affectively, the state of others, and (c) the behavioral repertoire that permits attempts to alleviate discomfort in others. 

Both temperament and social context contribute to individual differences in concern for others. Some developmental psychologists have hypothesized that empathic concern for others is an essential factor inhibiting aggression.

Contribution of social psychology
Empathic concern may produce an altruistic motivation to help people. The challenge of demonstrating the existence of altruistic motivation is to show how empathic concern leads to helping in ways that cannot be explained by prevailing theories of egoistic motivation. That is, a clear case needs to be made that it is concern about the other person's welfare, not a desire to improve one's own welfare, that primarily drives one's helping behavior in a particular situation. 

Empirical studies conducted by social psychologist Daniel Batson demonstrate that one feels empathic concern when one adopts the perspective of another person in need. His work emphasizes the different emotions evoked when imagining another situation from a self-perspective or imagining from another perspective. The former is often associated with personal distress (i.e., feelings of discomfort and anxiety), whereas the latter leads to empathic concern.

Social neuroscience evidence

Social neuroscience explores the biological underpinnings of empathic concern (and more generally, interpersonal sensitivity), using an integrative approach that bridges the biological and social levels. Neural systems, including autonomic functions, that rely on brain stem neuropeptides, such as oxytocin and vasopressin, are plausible correlates for empathic concern. Alternatively, vasopressin might be implicated in situations where a more active strategy is required for an effective response.

An association between executive functions, underpinned by the prefrontal cortex with reciprocal connections with the limbic system, the sense of agency, and empathic concern has been suggested based on lesion studies in neurological patients and functional neuroimaging experiments in healthy individuals. 

For instance, participants in one study reported more empathic concern when imagining the pain of others when adopting another's perspective, and more personal distress when imagining themselves to be in pain. 

fMRI scans revealed that imagining self in pain was associated with strong activation in brain areas involved in affective response to threat and pain, including the amygdala, insula, and anterior cingulate cortex. Imagine-other instructions produced higher activity in the right temporoparietal junction, which is associated with self-other distinctiveness and the sense of agency.

See also

 Affective neuroscience
 C. Sue Carter
 Edward O. Wilson
 Empathy-altruism
 Frans de Waal
 Jean Decety
 Moral emotions
 Social emotions
 Social neuroscience
 Stephen Porges
 W. D. Hamilton

References

Further reading
 Batson, C.D. (2009). "These things called empathy: eight related but distinct phenomena." In J. Decety & W. Ickes (Eds.), The Social Neuroscience of Empathy (pp. 3–15). Cambridge: MIT press.
 Batson, C.D. (2009). "Two forms of perspective taking: imagining how another feels and imagining how you would feel." In K. D. Markman, W.M.P. Klein and J.A. Suhr (Eds.), Handbook of Imagination and Mental Simulation (pp. 267–279). New York: Psychology Press.
 Decety, J. & Batson, C.D. (2007). "Social neuroscience approaches to interpersonal sensitivity." Social Neuroscience, 2(3-4): 151–157. 
 Decety, J. & Ickes, W. (Eds.). (2009). The Social Neuroscience of Empathy. Cambridge: MIT Press, Cambridge. 
 Thompson, E. (2001). "Empathy and consciousness." Journal of Consciousness Studies, 8: 1–32.
 Zahn-Waxler, C., & Radke-Yarrow, M. (1990). "The origins of empathic concern." Motivation and Emotion, 14: 107–125.

Neuroscience
Cognitive neuroscience
Emotion
Interpersonal relationships
Evolutionary biology
Sociobiology
Moral psychology
Empathy